John Bethune FRS (1725–1774) was an 18th-century Scottish minister remembered as a philosopher.

Life
He was born in Croy on 6 September 1725, the son of Farquhar Bethune and his wife, Margaret Rose. He was nephew to Rev Daniel Bethune aka Am Beutanach Beag (1679–1754).

Bethune studied at Marischal College, Aberdeen from 1738 to 1742. He then studied Divinity first at St Andrews University then at Edinburgh University. As was then normal for ministers, whilst awaiting a post, he was private tutor to the children of the Carruthers of Holmains in Dumfriesshire. He was licensed to preach by the Presbytery of the Church of Scotland in Lochmaben in March 1750. He was eventually ordained at Rosskeen in October 1754.

In February 1773 he was elected a Fellow of the Royal Society of London (the Royal Society of Edinburgh did not yet exist). This election was on the basis of his philosophical writings.

He died in the manse at Rosskeen on the night of 14/15 April 1774.

Family

In December 1755 he married his cousin, Janet Bethune, daughter of Rev Daniel Bethune. They had three daughters, all of whom died young.

Publications
see

A Short View of the Human Faculties and Passions (1766, second edition 1770)
Essays and Dissertations on Various Subjects Relating to Human Life and Happiness 2 vols. (1771)

References

1725 births
1774 deaths
18th-century Ministers of the Church of Scotland
Scottish philosophers
Fellows of the Royal Society